The 2015–16 St. Bonaventure Bonnies women's basketball team represented the St. Bonaventure University during the 2015–16 college basketball season. The Bonnies were coached by head coach Jim Crowley, in his sixteenth and final year in that position; Crowley left to take over the Providence Friars women's basketball team on May 10, 2016. The Bonnies are members of the Atlantic 10 Conference and play their home games at the Reilly Center. They finished the season 24–8, 12–4 in A-10 play to finish in fourth place. They lost in the quarterfinals of the Atlantic 10 women's tournament to VCU. They received an at large bid of the NCAA women's tournament where they defeated Oklahoma State in the first round before falling to Oregon State in the second round.

Crowley finished his tenure at St. Bonaventure with a record of 258–231.

2015–16 media
All non-televised Bonnies home games aired on the A-10 Digital Network. On radio, WGWE continued to broadcast games.

Roster

Schedule

|-
!colspan=9 style="background:#7B3F00; color:#FFFFFF;"| Exhibition

|-
!colspan=9 style="background:#7B3F00; color:#FFFFFF;"| Non-conference regular season

|-
!colspan=9 style="background:#7B3F00; color:#FFFFFF;"| Atlantic 10 regular season

|-
!colspan=9 style="background:#7B3F00; color:#FFFFFF;"| Atlantic 10 Tournament

|-
!colspan=9 style="background:#7B3F00; color:#FFFFFF;"| NCAA Women's Tournament

Rankings
2015–16 NCAA Division I women's basketball rankings

See also
 2015–16 St. Bonaventure Bonnies men's basketball team

References

Saint Bonaventure
St. Bonaventure Bonnies women's basketball seasons
St. Bonaventure